The Erewash Young Cricketers League (EYCL) is a part of Cricket Erewash, which was formed in 2004 as a result of an amalgamation of the EYCL, The Erewash Cricket Development Group and The Long Eaton & District Cricket Association; with an aim to promote cricket in the Borough of Erewash as a member of the Derbyshire Cricket Board (DCB). Objectives include representing Erewash in the formulation of regional cricketing policies, while prioritising the implementation within Erewash of the various aspects of the Derbyshire Cricket Board Development Plan.

Membership is open to formally constituted cricket clubs, schools and organisations based within the Borough of Erewash, with an Associate membership open to properly constituted cricket clubs and organisations based outside the Borough.

The EYCL organises and manages the Junior Borough league, for all junior group categories within the 5-17 age range. Junior match results are published on the eycl.play-cricket league website for all teams aged above U11s.

Club Performance
Showing league and cup/tournament champions of the Erewash Young Criketers League since 2009.

League Champions

Cup Champions

References

External links
 Official play-cricket website

English domestic cricket competitions
Cricket in Derbyshire